In the Ghetto is a Reggae album by Maiko Zulu. The album was produced in 2001 with the hit song "In The Ghetto".

See also
Reggae

2001 albums
Maiko Zulu albums